Anish Yohan Kuruvilla is an Indian actor and director who predominantly works in the Telugu film industry.

Before becoming a director, he was an executive producer with Sekhar Kammula, played the lead role in Dollar Dreams (2000), and played a supporting role in Anand (2004). After taking a break from acting for 12 years, he played a crucial role in the 2016 film Pelli Choopulu. He also appeared in the biographical film of Indian cricketer M. S. Dhoni.

Early life
Kuruvulla was born into a Malayali family and grew up in Hyderabad. He attended The Hyderabad Public School, Ramanthapur.

Career 
He played the lead role in Sekhar Kammula's debut film Dollar Dreams, and a supporting role in the blockbuster film Anand. He appeared in the 2016 film, Pelli Choopulu. He worked with Nagesh Kukunoor and Manishankar before his directorial debut, Avakai Biryani, produced by Sekhar Kammula; and Ko Antey Koti, produced by Sharwanand, who was also the lead actor.

Filmography

As actor

As director

References

External links 
 

Telugu film directors
Telugu male actors
Film directors from Hyderabad, India
Male actors from Hyderabad, India
Malayali people
Living people
Year of birth missing (living people)
Male actors in Telugu cinema
Indian film directors
21st-century Indian film directors
21st-century Indian male actors